Wired Sussex is an independent, not-for-profit membership organisation that supports the digital, media and information technology sector in Brighton and Sussex. Membership comprises companies and freelancers working in the digital and creative industries sector.

History 

Wired Sussex was established as an offshoot of the Sussex Enterprise Chamber of Commerce in 1997.  Wired Sussex became a fully independent entity, receiving no further direct public funding, in August 2007. Wired Sussex, alongside Manchester Digital, Bristol Media and, originally, the South East Media Network formed an alliance, called One Digital, in 2009 to further represent and support the United Kingdom's key digital technology clusters outside London.

Wired Sussex has been involved in a number of projects to support growth within the sector, including the creation of a Digital Catapult Centre in Brighton. The Centre is one of three Digital Catapult Centres set up by Innovate UK (the Technology Strategy Board) to promote research and development collaboration, in order to rapidly advance the UK's best digital ideas.

Previously, Wired Sussex delivered a two-year research and development project which mapped and measured Brighton’s creative, digital and IT (CDIT) cluster, carried out in 2013. The Brighton Fuse project supported mutually beneficial connections between higher education, those engaged in the creation of arts and culture and Brighton's digital technology sector.

A further study was completed in 2014 that focused on freelancers working in the Brighton sector.

Structure 
Wired Sussex is a company limited by guarantee (commonly known as a not-for-profit) and has no shareholders. It is governed by a board of directors, all of whom are owners and senior managers of prominent digital businesses in South East England. Its current chair is Alex Morrison, CEO of Cogapp and its deputy Chair is Holger Bollmann, Director of WPM Education.

References 

 Monty Munford (09 Julyl 2013). "Brighton Wants to Be London's Silicon Valley". Mashable. Retrieved 29 May 2015.
 Greg Clark MP & Nick Clegg (11 March 2014). “Brighton City Deal to help create "Silicon Beach"”. Gov.UK. Retrieved 29 May 2015.

External links 

Companies based in Sussex
Organizations established in 2007
Non-profit technology